Constituency NA-142 (Kasur-V) was a constituency for the National Assembly of Pakistan. It comprised mainly the city of Phool Nagar, which, according to the 2018 delimitations, has now been included in Constituency NA-140 (Kasur-IV).

Election 2002 

General elections were held on 10 Oct 2002. Sardar Muhammad Asif Nakai of PML-Q won by 58,420 votes.

Election 2008 

General elections were held on 18 Feb 2008. Sardar Talib Hassan Nakai of PML-Q won by 47,192 votes.

Election 2013 

General elections were held on 11 May 2013. Rana Muhammad Hayat Khan of PML-N won by 65,758 votes and became the  member of National Assembly.

References

External links 
 Election result's official website

NA-142
Abolished National Assembly Constituencies of Pakistan